is a Japanese actor.

Filmography

Film

Television series

Japanese dub
 Godzilla: King of the Monsters (2019) - Dr. Mark Russell (Kyle Chandler)
 Godzilla vs. Kong (2021) - Dr. Mark Russell (Kyle Chandler)
 The Lost City (2022) - Alan Caprison / Dash McMahon (Channing Tatum)

Awards

References

External links
 Official Website
 

21st-century Japanese male actors
Japanese male film actors
Japanese male television actors
Living people
1984 births
Male actors from Tokyo